Leesburg Historic District may refer to:

Leesburg (Salmon, Idaho), a community and historic district listed on the NRHP in Lemhi County, Idaho
Leesburg Historic District (Leesburg, Indiana), listed on the NRHP in Kosciusko County, Indiana
Leesburg Historic District (Leesburg, Virginia), listed on the NRHP in Virginia

See also
Leesburg (disambiguation)